NIPO, previously named NIPO Software, is a long term provider to the professional market research industry for online, CAPI and CATI survey solutions. NIPO is a major worldwide Market Research software provider.

NIPO's main offering is centered around the Nfield platform, hosted in a SaaS model on Microsoft Azure cloud servers. The Nfield suite covers all aspects of market research, including questionnaire design, data collection, tabulations, fieldwork management and reporting. Besides Nfield, NIPO offers on-premise software.

The company is headquartered in Amsterdam, Netherlands and has branches in Madrid, Hong Kong and Argentina.

NIPO has roots in market research. NIPO Software was founded by Arnoud van Zanten in the 1970s as a department of NIPO, the market research institute, now Kantar TNS Netherlands. The NIPO name originally stood for Netherlands Institute of Public Opinion, which was established by Wim de Jonge and Jan Stapel in September 1945. In 1986 NIPO (Software) became an independent company from the research institute to be able to cater for both internal as external customers. In 1999 NIPO was purchased by Taylor Nelson Sofres, now called Kantar TNS.

NIPO is a member of ESOMAR. NIPO is ISO 27001:2013 certified.

Solutions 
The Software suite of NIPO includes:

Nfield, the cloud based Saas platform for online and CAPI surveys.
NIPO Fieldwork System (NFS), the on-premise suite for CATI, CAPI and online surveys.

References

Market research
Software companies of the Netherlands
Dutch companies established in 1979
Software companies established in 1979